The 2010 Wofford Terriers football team represented Wofford College during the 2010 NCAA Division I FCS football season. The team was led by 23rd-year head coach Mike Ayers and played its home games at Gibbs Stadium. It finished the regular season with a 9–2 record overall and a 7–1 record in the Southern Conference, making it conference co-champion alongside Appalachian State. The team qualified for the playoffs, in which it was eliminated in the quarterfinals by Georgia Southern.

Schedule

References

Wofford
Wofford Terriers football seasons
Southern Conference football champion seasons
Wofford
Wofford Terriers football